Peter-Lee Vassell (born 3 February 1998) is a Jamaican professional footballer who plays as a midfielder for Hartford Athletic and the Jamaica national team.

Early life and education 

Vassell grew up in St. James parish in Jamaica in a footballing family. He attended Howard Cooke Primary School and Cornwall College.

Career

Club 
Vassell began his career at Faulkland FC in Montego Bay in the Western Super League, before spending some time in the RSPL with Montego Bay United. He moved to Harbour View ahead of the 2017-18 RSPL season.

In January 2019, Vassell was drafted and signed by Los Angeles FC.

In August 2019, Vassell was loaned to USL Championship side Phoenix Rising FC.

In April 2021, Vassell joined Indy Eleven in the USL Championship ahead of the 2021 season. Following the 2021 season, it was announced that Vassell's contract option was declined by Indy Eleven.

In January 2022, Vassell joined Hartford Athletic in the USL Championship ahead of the 2022 season.

International 
Vassell has been capped at under-17, under-20, under-23 and senior team levels for Jamaica.

Career statistics

Club

Notes

International

International goals
Scores and results list Jamaica's goal tally first.

References

External links
 
 Peter-Lee Vassell at caribbeanfootballdatabase.com

1998 births
Living people
Jamaican footballers
Jamaica international footballers
People from Saint James Parish, Jamaica
Association football midfielders
Montego Bay United F.C. players
Harbour View F.C. players
National Premier League players
Los Angeles FC players
Los Angeles FC draft picks
Major League Soccer players
2019 CONCACAF Gold Cup players
Phoenix Rising FC players
USL Championship players
Indy Eleven players
Hartford Athletic players